VFP may stand for:

VFP (instruction set), an extension to the ARM instruction set
Visual FoxPro, a programming language
All-Russia Fascist Party (1930s–1942)
Very Fast Picket, a class of fictional artificially intelligent starship in The Culture universe of late Scottish author Iain Banks
Veterans Freedom Party, a minor party in the Philippines
Veterans for Peace, an anti-war organisation in the United States and other countries